Pallokerho Keski-Uusimaa (abbreviated PK Keski-Uusimaa) is a football club serving the sub-region of Keski-Uusimaa in Finland and is centred on the towns of Järvenpää, Kerava and Tuusula.  The club was formed in 2005 and the men's first team currently plays in the Kakkonen (Second Division).  The Chairman of PK Keski-Uusimaa is Mikko Bergman.

Background

The club was founded on 30 November 2005 as a flagship club for the Keski-Uusimaa area with Järvenpään Palloseura, Keravan Pallo-75 and Tuusulan Palloseura as the feeder clubs.  Founder club members included Jussi Hautamäki, Mikko Honkanen, Miika Tiira, Lassi Kunttu, Markku Pyykkölä, Raine Nieminen, Tero Valtonen, Pekka Ekegren and Timo Helkamo.

The project had been considered as early as 1988 but the time was not right.  However, in the early 2000 decade discussions were reopened by the leading local clubs (JäPS, KP-75 and TuPS) and joint working initiatives came forward such as staff training, the Lionsliigaa (Lions League) for 12- to 15-year-olds and the Keski-Uusimaa Academy.

On 15 December 2005 the clubs gave their final approval to the project and the historic three-club umbrella organisation was established. The PK Keski-Uusimaa club does not compete with the feeder clubs with, but complements them enabling the more talented and motivated high-profile players (B-juniors upwards) to play locally rather than in Helsinki.

PK Keski-Uusimaa has been playing in the Kakkonen (the Second Division), the third tier of Finnish football since 2008.

Club Structure

PK Keski-Uusimaa runs 2 men's team, 7 boys teams and 3 girls teams in an elite junior section.  The club play their home games in Kerava and Tuusula at the following venues:

 Kalevan urheilupuisto, Kerava
 Tuusulan urheilukeskus, Tuusula

2010 season

PK Keski-Uusimaa Men's Team are competing in Group A (Lohko A) of the Kakkonen administered by the Football Association of Finland  (Suomen Palloliitto) .  This is the third highest tier in the Finnish football system.  In 2009 Pallokerho Keski-Uusimaa finished in fifth position in their Kakkonen section.

References and sources
Official Website
Finnish Wikipedia
Suomen Cup
 Pallokerho Keski-Uusimaa Facebook

Footnotes

Football clubs in Finland
Järvenpää
Kerava
Tuusula
2005 establishments in Finland